Gabrielle Carey (born 10 January 1959) is an Australian writer noted for the teen novel, Puberty Blues, which she co-wrote with Kathy Lette. This novel was the first teenage novel published in Australia that was written by teenagers. Carey has since become a senior lecturer in the Creative Writing program at the University of Technology Sydney, studying James Joyce and Randolph Stow.

Career
Carey was born in Sydney, New South Wales, Australia and was raised in an atheist, humanist household. Her father was Alex Carey.

Carey met Kathy Lette at the age of 12 while still at school and became best friends. Both left school early (Carey at 15 and Lette a year later) against the wishes of their families. Leaving home, they shared a flat together and wrote Puberty Blues, which was based on the lives of young male surfers in Sydney and their girlfriends. The novel shocked many people by its graphic description of teenage behaviour. Carey and Lette also wrote a column for the Sun Herald, under the name "The Salami Sisters".

Once the book was published Carey and Lette separated and their lives moved in different directions. In 1981, Bruce Beresford directed a film adaptation of the novel.

A telefilm version of Carey's autobiographical book, Just Us, an account of her relationship with Parramatta Gaol prisoner, Terry Haley, also was made in 1986. It was directed by Gordon Glenn from a screenplay by Ted Roberts.

While in Ireland in the mid-1980s, she converted to the Catholic faith, becoming convinced of the importance of spirituality in everyday life. After a year in Ireland she left and for several years lived in a small village in Mexico, returning to Australia in the early 1990s.

Her 2020 book, Only Happiness Here, was shortlisted for the 2021 Nib Literary Award.

Carey has a daughter and a son. She lives in Sydney and is a freelance writer, writing occasional articles for The Sydney Morning Herald and other newspapers. She currently works as a lecturer in writing at the University of Technology, Sydney.

Bibliography

Novels
Puberty Blues with Kathy Lette (McPhee Gribble, 1979) 
The Borrowed Girl (Picador, 1994)

Autobiography and memoir
Just Us (Penguin Books, 1984) 
In My Father's House (Pan Macmillan Publishers Australia, 1992) 
Moving among Strangers: Randolph Stow and My Family (University of Queensland Press, 2013) 
Falling Out of Love with Ivan Southall (Australian Scholarly Publishing, 2018)

Other non-fiction
The Penguin Book of Death with Rosemary Sorensen (Penguin Books, 1997) 
So Many Selves (ABC Books, 2006) 
Waiting Room (Scribe Publications, 2009)

Critical studies and reviews of Carey's work
Only Happiness Here

References

External links

1959 births
Living people
20th-century Australian novelists
20th-century Australian women writers
Australian autobiographers
Australian freelance journalists
Australian Roman Catholics
Australian women novelists
Converts to Roman Catholicism from atheism or agnosticism
People from the Sutherland Shire
University of Technology Sydney alumni
Academic staff of the University of Technology Sydney
Writers from Sydney
Women autobiographers